Linda Gentile (born February 19, 1951) is an American politician who served in the Connecticut House of Representatives from the 104th district from 2005 to 2019.

References

1951 births
Living people
Democratic Party members of the Connecticut House of Representatives
21st-century American politicians
21st-century American women politicians
People from Derby, Connecticut
Women state legislators in Connecticut